Hoërskool Oos-Moot is a public Afrikaans medium co-educational high school situated in the northern suburbs of Pretoria in the Gauteng province of South Africa.

Sport 
Hoërskool Oos-Moot has been performing on sports during the year.

 Archery
 Athletics
 Cricket
 Cross country
 Cycling
 Diving
 Equestrian 
 Golf 
 Hockey
 Netball
 Rugby
 Squash
 Swimming
 Table tennis
 Tennis
 Water polo

References

External links

http://www.schools4sa.co.za/school-profile/hoerskool-oos-moot/
http://www.pretoria-south-africa.com/hoerskool-oos-moot.html

Afrikaner culture in Pretoria
Schools in Gauteng
High schools in South Africa
Educational institutions established in 1952
1952 establishments in South Africa